In mathematics, and more particularly in set theory, a cover (or covering) of a set  is a family of subsets of  whose union is all of . More formally, if  is an indexed family of subsets  (indexed by the set ), then  is a cover of  if . Thus the collection  is a cover of  if each element of  belongs to at least one of the subsets . 

A subcover of a cover of a set is a subset of the cover that also covers the set. A cover is called an open cover if each of its elements is an open set.

Cover in topology

Covers are commonly used in the context of topology.

That is, we may cover  with either sets in  itself or sets in the parent space .

Let C be a cover of a topological space X. A subcover of C is a subset of C that still covers X.

We say that C is an  if each of its members is an open set (i.e. each Uα is contained in T, where T is the topology on X).

A cover of X is said to be locally finite if every point of X has a neighborhood that intersects only finitely many sets in the cover.  Formally, C = {Uα} is locally finite if for any  there exists some neighborhood N(x) of x such that the set

is finite. A cover of X is said to be point finite if every point of X is contained in only finitely many sets in the cover. A cover is point finite if it is locally finite, though the converse is not necessarily true.

Refinement 

Formally,

 is a refinement of  if for all  there exists  such that 

Every subcover is also a refinement, but the opposite is not always true. A subcover is made from the sets that are in the cover, but omitting some of them; whereas a refinement is made from any sets that are subsets of the sets in the cover.

Generally speaking, a refinement of a given structure is another that in some sense contains it. Examples are to be found when partitioning an interval (one refinement of  being ), considering topologies (the standard topology in Euclidean space being a refinement of the trivial topology). When subdividing simplicial complexes (the first barycentric subdivision of a simplicial complex is a refinement), the situation is slightly different: every simplex in the finer complex is a face of some simplex in the coarser one, and both have equal underlying polyhedra.

Yet another notion of refinement is that of star refinement.

Subcover

A simple way to get a subcover is to omit the sets contained in another set in the cover. Consider specifically open covers. Next, for each  we select a  containing  (requiring the axiom of choice). Then  is a subcover of  Hence the cardinality of a subcover of an open cover can be as small as that of any topological basis. Hence in particular second countability implies a space is Lindelöf.

Compactness

The language of covers is often used to define several topological properties related to compactness. A topological space X is said to be
Compact if every open cover has a finite subcover, (or equivalently that every open cover has a finite refinement);
Lindelöf if every open cover has a countable subcover, (or equivalently that every open cover has a countable refinement);
Metacompact if every open cover has a point-finite open refinement;
Paracompact if every open cover admits a locally finite open refinement.

For some more variations see the above articles.

Covering dimension

A topological space X is said to be of covering dimension n if every open cover of X has a point-finite open refinement such that no point of X is included in more than n+1 sets in the refinement and if n is the minimum value for which this is true. If no such minimal n exists, the space is said to be of infinite covering dimension.

See also

Notes

References
Introduction to Topology, Second Edition, Theodore W. Gamelin & Robert Everist Greene. Dover Publications 1999. 
General Topology, John L. Kelley. D. Van Nostrand Company, Inc. Princeton, NJ. 1955.

External links
 

Topology
General topology
Families of sets